Codex Guelferbytanus A designated by Pe or 024 (in the Gregory-Aland numbering), ε 33 (von Soden), is a Greek uncial manuscript of the Gospels, dated palaeographically to the 6th century. The manuscript is very lacunose.

Description 

The codex contains the text of the four Gospels in a very fragmentary condition on 44 leaves. Written in two columns per page, 24 lines per column. It does not contain in genere breathings and accents. Sometimes it uses breathings, but often wrongly. It has errors of iotacism in the Alexandrian way.

 Contents
 Matthew 1:11-21; 3:13-4:19; 10:7-19; 10:42-11:11; 13:40-50; 14:15-15:3.29-39; 
 Mark 1:2-11; 3:5-17; 14:13-24.48-61; 15:12-37; 
 Luke 1:1-13; 2:9-20; 6:21-42; 7:32-8:2; 8:31-50; 9:26-36; 10:36-11:4; 12:34-45; 14:14-25; 15:13-16:22; 18:13-39; 20:21-21:3; 22:3-16; 23:20-33; 23:45-24:1; 24:14-37; 
 John 1:29-40; 2:13-25; 21:1-11.

The notation of the Ammonian Sections is given in the margin of text, but without reference to the Eusebian Canons. The nomina sacra attested in this uncial fragment are ΙΣ (Iesous, Jesus)  ΧΣ (Christos, Christ), ΚΣ (Kurios, Lord) ΘΣ, ΥΣ, ΠΗΡ, ΠΝΑ, ΙΛΗΜ, ΑΝΟΣ, and ΔΑΔ. The number "forty" is also written with an abbreviation — Μ. All the abbreviations are marked with the superscript bar.

It is a palimpsest. The whole book is known as Codex Guelferbytanus 64 Weissenburgensis. The upper text is in Latin and contains Isidore of Seville's Origines.

Text 

The Greek text of this codex is a representative of the Byzantine text-type. Aland placed it in Category V. According to the Claremont Profile Method in Luke 20 it has mixed text.

According to Scrivener the codex agrees with AB united 50 times, sides with B against A 29 times, and accords with A against B in 102 places.

History 

Formerly the manuscript was held in Bobbio, Weissenburg, Mainz, and Prague. The Duke of Brunswick bought it in 1689.

The manuscript became known to scholars in the latter half of the 18th century. Franz Anton Knittel (1721–1792) discovered it in the Ducal Library of Wolfenbüttel. Knittel recognized two palimpsest Greek texts of the New Testament in the codex and designated them by A and B. F. A. He published the Gothic text of the codex (Codex Carolinus) at Brunswick in 1762. The lower Greek text was collated and edited by Tischendorf in 1860.

The codex is located at the Herzog August Bibliothek (Weissenburg 64) in Wolfenbüttel.

See also 

 List of New Testament uncials
 Textual criticism

References

Further reading 

 Constantin von Tischendorf, Monumenta Sacra inedita VI (Leipzig, 1869), pp. XIII-XV, XVII, XVIII, 249-338.
 G. Cavallo, "Ricerche sulla maiuscola biblica" (Firenze: Le Monnier, 1967), p. 92.
 U. B. Schmid, D. C. Parker, W. J. Elliott, The Gospel according to St. John: The majuscules (Brill 2007), pp. 39–44. [text of the codex in the Gospel of John]

External links 
 Digitalized Codex Guelferbytanus 64 Weissenburgensis at the Herzog August Bibliothek

Greek New Testament uncials
6th-century biblical manuscripts
Palimpsests
Herzog August Library